Sven Renders (born 12 August 1981 in Wilrijk) is a Belgian professional road bicycle racer who rides for Willems Verandas.

External links

Belgian male cyclists
Living people
1981 births
People from Wilrijk
Cyclists from Antwerp